Mark Andrew Watson (born 13 February 1980) is an English comedian and novelist.

Early life
Watson was born in Bristol to a Welsh mother and English father. He has younger twin sisters and a brother, Paul. He attended Bristol Grammar School, where he won a "Gabbler of the Year" award. He went on to study English at Queens' College, Cambridge, graduating with first class honours. At university he was a member of the Footlights and contemporary of Stefan Golaszewski, Tim Key and Dan Stevens. He was part of the revue which was nominated for the Best Newcomer category in the Perrier Comedy Awards at the 2001 Edinburgh Festival Fringe and also co-directed a revue with Key.

Career

Comedy

Although not brought up in Wales, Watson used to deliver his act with a common Welsh accent which is not quite his own. He adopted it when he started stand-up comedy saying that it made him "more comfortable to be talking in a voice that I didn't quite recognise as my own". He has since reverted to his own accent.

Watson has appeared regularly at the Edinburgh Festival Fringe, winning the first ever Panel Prize at the if.comeddies in 2006 and being nominated for Best Newcomer at the 2005 Perrier Comedy Awards. His other awards include the  Time Out Critics' Choice Award 2006 and a Barry Award nomination for best show at the Melbourne Comedy Festival 2006.

Watson has performed several unusual shows at the Edinburgh Fringe and Melbourne Festivals, including marathon shows lasting 24 hours or more. The first of these was performed at the 2004 Edinburgh Festival Fringe, which lasted 24 hours. At the end of the show he proposed to his girlfriend Emily Howes, who accepted. These shows have featured guest appearances from other performers such as Tim Key, Tim Minchin, Adam Hills, Daniel Kitson, David O'Doherty, Brendon Burns and John Dorney as the balladeer.

At the 2006 Edinburgh Festival Fringe Watson hosted a literary workshop-cum-interactive comedy show entitled Mark Watson, And His Audience, Write A Novel. The aim was to write, by the end of August, a novel begun from scratch and woven entirely from audience suggestions, with another 2,000 words or so added each day. The novel was not finished within the month.

At the 2007 Fringe, Watson hosted a panel show We Need Answers with Alex Horne and Tim Key. This saw 16 comedians take part in a knock out quiz where all the questions and answers came from text service Any Question Answered. Paul Sinha won the competition, beating Josie Long in the final. We Need Answers returned in 2008 with fewer rounds, Josie Long emerged as winner, beating Sinha in the semi-final and Kristen Schaal in the final.

Watson performed his final 24-hour Fringe show at the 2009 festival along with his "Earth Summit" and his "Edit". The Earth Summit was Watson's version of the Al Gore talk about world pollution and global warming and the Edit was a compilation of Watson's fringe shows to date, made particularly for those who had not seen him perform there. Watson's debut DVD, The Mark Watson Edit, was initially due for release on 15 November 2010. However, Watson was forced to shelve the project and a new DVD recording was released on 28 November 2011, entitled Mark Watson Live.

In 2019, Watson staged a 26.2-hour live show to coincide with the London Marathon, and during the COVID-19 pandemic in 2020 he hosted two 24-hour "Watsonathon" events on the Twitch streaming platform.

Live shows

Television

A three-episode run of We Need Answers began on BBC Four on 12 February 2009, based on the Edinburgh Fringe show of the same name. As with the live show, Watson co-hosted with Tim Key and Alex Horne. A further 13 episodes were broadcast later in 2009. Guests for the series included Germaine Greer, Michael Rosen and Jilly Goolden.

In 2010 ITV4 commissioned Mark Watson Kicks Off, a sports panel show, hosted by Watson, where each week with three celebrities taking part in numerous rounds including "Beat the Best" where Watson takes on a sporting champion but with a twist and "I'm not a successful sports star but I'm related to someone who is" where the three  celebrities ask questions to a guest who is related to a sports star.

In 2011, Watson hosted a pilot for an improvisational comedy show called Improvisation My Dear Mark Watson. The one-off episode was commissioned and broadcast by Dave, who chose not to create a full series. The pilot aired on 9 July.

In 2012, Watson starred with Micky Flanagan and host Mark Dolan as a captain in the Channel 4 panel programme The Mad Bad Ad Show.

Guest appearances
Watson has made occasional appearances on BBC Two's comedy panel show Mock The Week; he has also been a panellist on BBC music quiz show Never Mind The Buzzcocks four times—once as guest captain and once as presenter—in addition to appearing on the topical panel show Have I Got News for You. He has appeared on the panel shows Would I Lie to You?, QI, Argumental and Richard Osman's House of Games.
Watson appeared as a talking head in Armando Iannucci's spoof documentary series Time Trumpet.

In Australia, Watson has been seen on Rove, Good News Week, Spicks and Specks and the Melbourne International Comedy Festival, all aired in April 2007.

Watson performed stand up on episode one of Michael McIntyre's Comedy Roadshow, aired 7 June 2009.

In 2010, Watson took part in Channel 4's Comedy Gala, a benefit show held in aid of Great Ormond Street Children's Hospital, filmed live at the O2 Arena in London on 30 March.

On 6 May 2011, he appeared on New Zealand comedy panel show 7 Days.

In 2017, he competed in series 5 of Taskmaster against Bob Mortimer, Sally Phillips, Nish Kumar and Aisling Bea finishing joint second.

Also in 2017, Watson appeared on Celebrity Island with Bear Grylls alongside Iwan Thomas, Jordan Stephens, Lucy Mecklenburgh, Melody Thornton, RJ Mitte, Ryan Thomas, Sharron Davies and Shazia Mirza. Watson left on doctors orders after suffering from severe chest pains and insomnia in the final episode.

In February 2021, he appeared on Richard Osman's House of Games alongside Josie Lawrence, Raj Bisram and Laura Whitmore.

Radio
Mark Watson Makes the World Substantially Better aired on BBC Radio 4 in February 2007, followed by a second series in August 2008. Both series featured poems by Tim Key and music, performed by Tim Minchin in the first series and Tom Basden in the second. In August 2009, Watson hosted a three-episode series on BBC Radio 5 Live called 100 Million or Bust, where a panel of guests attempted to spend £100 million on transfers as managers of an English Premier League team.

Another collaboration with Basden and Key, Mark Watson's Live Address to the Nation, was broadcast as a pilot in February 2011, with a full series of 6 episodes broadcast in late 2011.

A similar series entitled Mark Watson Talks About Life, again featuring Basden and Key, was broadcast in autumn 2014.

Watson has made regular appearances on the BBC Radio 5 Live show Fighting Talk.

Books
Watson has written seven novels: Bullet Points (2004), A Light-Hearted Look At Murder (2007), Eleven (2011), The Knot (2012), Hotel Alpha (2015), The Place That Didn't Exist (2016), and Contacts (2020). In addition, he has written the non-fiction book Crap at the Environment (2008), following his own efforts to halve his carbon footprint over the course of one year. In 2015, he released a graphic novel, Dan and Sam, with illustrations by Oliver Harud.

Other work
In 2009, Watson appeared in adverts for Magners Pear Cider, which became the subject of an extended routine by fellow comic Stewart Lee as part of his 2009, "If You Prefer A Milder Comedian, Please Ask For One" live show. Watson provided the voice over for a rabbit in an Innocent Smoothies advert in 2010.

On 25 February, Watson presented the 2009 NME Awards at Brixton Academy. At the start of the 2009/2010 season, Watson wrote a regular article in the Bristol City official matchday programme Well Red.

In December 2009, Watson's television drama A Child's Christmases in Wales starring Ruth Jones was broadcast as part of the Christmas 2009 season on BBC Four; it was described as peeping into the Christmases of a South Wales family during the 1980s.

He has his own production company Impatient Productions which produces his own radio shows as well as producing for others such as Angela Barnes

From 2018, Watson appeared in TUI commercials alongside fellow comedian Zoe Lyons on Sky One.

In 2020 during the COVID-19 pandemic, Watson, Tim Key and Alex Horne started a YouTube channel playing a game known as No More Jockeys. The three were given Chortle Legends of Lockdown awards for No More Jockeys as well as their individual work. In December, he launched a podcast through his production company with co-host Michael Chakravety called menkind, discussing masculinity with a weekly guest.

Personal life 
Watson was married to Emily Howes, a fellow novelist, writer-performer and theatre director. Tim Key was Watson's best man. Watson and Howes have two children; they divorced in 2019.

Watson is now in a relationship with comedy producer Lianne Coop; they live in East London.

Watson is a lifelong supporter of Bristol City Football Club.

Stand-up specials
 Mark Watson Live (28 November 2011, DVD)
 Flaws (2014, DVD)
 The Infinite Show (2020, Vimeo)
 This Can't Be It (2022, Amazon Prime)

References

External links 
 
 Mark Watson Fans
  Profile at Karushi Management
 
 

1980 births
English male comedians
21st-century English novelists
Living people
Writers from Bristol
People educated at Bristol Grammar School
Alumni of Queens' College, Cambridge
English people of Welsh descent
English male novelists
21st-century English comedians
21st-century English male writers